This is a list of Georgian cheeses. Over 250 varieties of cheese are produced in Georgia.

Georgian cheeses

 Dambal khacho
 Guda, cheese from eastern Georgia's mountain region
 Imeruli, cheese from Imereti region
 Kalti
 Rotten cheese
 Sulguni, cheese from Samegrelo region. It is sometimes smoked.
 Svanetian marchvi
 Tenili cheese, a variety of string cheese from Meskheti region of southern Georgia. In 2013, it was inscribed on the list of Intangible cultural heritage of Georgia.

See also

 Georgian cuisine
 Khachapuri – a traditional Georgian dish of cheese-filled bread
 List of cheeses

References

Further reading

External links

 Cheese Makers Traveling Through Republic of Georgia

cheese